"Salsa Tequila" is a novelty song by Norwegian comedian Anders Nilsen in Spanish. He doesn't speak Spanish, as he admits in the song by saying "No hablo español" (I do not speak Spanish). To make the song catchy, he uses accordion and saxophone mixes, noting that their usage had become prevalent in many recent hits. The song is written and produced by Nilsen, and was released in 2014 on Sony Music. It was a huge commercial success in Norway and the Netherlands and has charted in Belgium. The lyric music video is directed by Galvan Mehidi.

Lyrics
Nilsen collected various habitual greetings and words and phrases in Spanish (e.g., muy bueno, sí, hola, dale, Santa María, sombrero, muchas gracias, mi amigo, corazón, desperado, arriba, uno, dos, tres, cuatro, porque, machete, cuanto cuesta, señorita, fútbol), some popular Spanish destinations (Madrid, Mallorca etc.), various traditional Hispanic foods and drinks (as in title salsa and tequila, but also burrito, taco, nachos, mojito, Old El Paso, TexMex, guacamole, jalapeño, enchilada, bacalao, cortado, chorizo, cerveza), some Spanish, Portuguese and Hispanic celebrities (Eva Mendes, Shakira, Adelén, Salma Hayek, Ricky Martin, Antonio Banderas, Las Ketchup, Carlos Santana, Selena Gomez, Ronaldo) and a few Spanish language international hits ("Macarena", "Livin' la Vida Loca", "La Bamba", "Bailando", "Chihuahua", "Gasolina").

The song is a parody of club songs (former 'summer hits'), with the message that a song could become a hit even if the lyrics do not make any sense.

Track list
"Salsa Tequila" (3:19)

Charts

Weekly charts

Year-end charts

See also
The Manual
Nonsense verse
Prisencolinensinainciusol

References

External links
Salsa Tequila on Anders Nilsen's VEVO YouTube channel

Novelty songs
Musical parodies
Songs about Spain
Songs about Mexico
Songs about South America
Spanish-language songs
2014 songs
Sony Music singles
2014 singles
Dutch Top 40 number-one singles
Number-one singles in Norway